National Priority is a 1979 Argentine short film. It was the first film made by Juan J. Campanella, Argentina's most successful contemporary filmmaker.
The 22-minute film features Campanella himself and actor Ricardo Cerone.

Cast
Juan J. Campanella
Ricardo Cerone
Ismael Alba
Jorge Rosas
Carlos Muy
Pablo Rossetti
Carlos Seraphim

References

Sources

External links
 

1979 films
1979 short films
1970s Spanish-language films
Films directed by Juan José Campanella
Argentine short films
1970s Argentine films